Bolesław Bogdan Piasecki, alias Leon Całka, Wojciech z Królewca, Sablewski (18 February 1915 – 1 January 1979) was a Polish politician and writer.

Biography 
In the Second Polish Republic he was one of the more prominent Polish nationalist politicians, playing an important role in the leadership of Obóz Narodowo-Radykalny.
In 1934 he was interned in Bereza Kartuska.  After his release, he became the leader of the illegal, extreme right faction   This organisation advocated "Catholic totalitarianism" and is considered by many to have been a fascist movement with ideological influences from anti-Semitism, Spanish Falangism, and Italian Fascism. Nevertheless Piasecki refused to cooperate with the occupation of Poland after the Nazi invasion of 1939. 

During the Second World War he was a member of the Polish resistance, leading the grouping Konfederacja Narodu (merged into the Armia Krajowa in 1943) and taking part in the fighting around Vilnius. He was imprisoned by the Gestapo in 1939, and after his release fought with the Home Army in the Warsaw Uprising.  Afterwards, he was arrested by the Soviet NKVD and imprisoned in Lublin Castle. After being interrogated by Marshal Ivan Serov, in a drastic conversion from his previous stance began to cooperate with the Communist Polish People's Republic.

After the war, in 1945, he co-founded and directed a so-called social progressive movement of lay Catholics, grouped around the weekly publication  (Today and Tomorrow). The newspaper attacked the Polish People's Party opposition and endorsed the government in the 1946 Polish people's referendum campaign. In 1947 he created the PAX Association and was the chairman of its governing body (until his death). Piasecki described the newspaper's primary aim as "the reconstruction of a Catholic doctrine with respect to the ongoing conflict between Marxism and capitalism." The organization also managed the Polish branch of the Catholic charity Caritas Internationalis after it was nationalized by the government.

In 1955 several important members of Pax, including Janusz Zabłocki and future Prime Minister Tadeusz Mazowiecki, revolted and quit their posts at the party and newspapers. Afterwards, the importance of PAX diminished (and Piasecki's role along with it). Piasecki had also never been accepted by the mainstream Catholic Church in Poland, with Cardinal Stefan Wyszyński prohibiting the clergy from subscribing to Piasecki's newspapers. In 1957 Piasecki's teenage son Bohdan was abducted, possibly by agents of the Polish Ministry of Public Security. Nonetheless Pax remained a prominent organisation until 1989 and its successors still exist today.

In later years, Piasecki was a member of the Polish Sejm from 1965, where he presided over the grouping of members associated with PAX.  In 1971-1979 he was a member of the Polish Council of State.

Honours and awards
 Silver Cross of the Virtuti Militari (1944)
 Commander's Cross with Star of the Order of Polonia Restituta (1964), previously awarded the Commander's Cross (1955)
 Order of the Banner of Work, 1st Class (1969)

References

Further reading 
Mikołaj Kunicki (2005). "The Red and the Brown: Boleslaw Piasecki, the Polish Communists, and the Anti-Zionist Campaign in Poland, 1967-68". East European Politics & Societies 19 (2): pp. 185–225. 
Dudek, Antoni/Pytel, Grzegorz (1990). Bolesław Piasecki. Próba biografii politycznej (Wstęp Jan Józef Lipski). Londyn: Aneks. .

1915 births
1979 deaths
Politicians from Łódź
Polish Roman Catholics
Polish nationalists
Camp of Great Poland politicians
Falangists
PAX Association members
Members of the Polish Sejm 1965–1969
Members of the Polish Sejm 1969–1972
Members of the Polish Sejm 1972–1976
Members of the Polish Sejm 1976–1980
Polish military personnel of World War II
Home Army officers
University of Warsaw alumni
Recipients of the Silver Cross of the Virtuti Militari
Commanders with Star of the Order of Polonia Restituta
Recipients of the Order of Polonia Restituta (1944–1989)
Recipients of the Order of the Banner of Work
National Radical Camp politicians